Medicine, Conflict and Survival is a scholarly publication covering the health aspects of violence and human rights. It is an official journal of MEDACT  and International Physicians for the Prevention of Nuclear War (IPPNW).

References

External links 
 Medicine, Conflict and Survival homepage 
 MEDACT
 IPPNW

General medical journals